Albert Van Cauwenburg (born 9 January 1891, date of death unknown) was a Belgian equestrian. He competed in the individual vaulting event at the 1920 Summer Olympics.

References

1891 births
Year of death missing
Belgian male equestrians
Olympic equestrians of Belgium
Equestrians at the 1920 Summer Olympics
Place of birth missing